Matapu is a locality in southern Taranaki Region of New Zealand. Hāwera is to the south-east, Eltham to the north-east, Kaponga to the north-west and Manaia to the south-west.

Marae

Matapu has three marae, associated with Ngāruahine hapū.

Aotearoa Marae and its Ngākaunui are affiliated with Ōkahu-Inuāwai. Te Aroha o Tītokowaru Marae and Te Aroha meeting house belong to Ngāti Manuhiakai. Kanihi or Māwhitiwhiti Marae and Kanihi meeting house are affiliated with Kanihi-Umutahi.

In October 2020, the Government committed $1,259,392 from the Provincial Growth Fund to upgrade Aotearoa Marae and 7 other Ngāti Raukawa marae, creating 18 jobs.

Education
Matapu School is a coeducational full primary (years 1–8) school with a decile rating of 7 and a roll of 75. In 2005, Okaiawa and Mangatoki Schools closed and merged with Matapu School.

Notes

External links
 Matapu School website

Populated places in Taranaki
South Taranaki District